Joseph Turgeon (April 5, 1751 – May 1, 1831) was a master carpenter and political figure in Lower Canada. He represented Leinster in the Legislative Assembly of Lower Canada from 1808 to 1809.

He was born Joseph-Marie Turgeon in Beaumont, the son of Jacques Turgeon and Marie Fournier. Turgeon established himself at L'Assomption, moving to Lavaltrie around 1790. In 1778, he married Louise Marion. Turgeon was defeated when he ran for reelection to the assembly in 1809. He died in Lavaltrie at the age of 80.

References 
 

1751 births
1831 deaths
Members of the Legislative Assembly of Lower Canada